Darko Balaban (born September 22, 1989) is a Serbian professional basketball player for Balkan of the Bulgarian NBL.

Professional career
Balaban grew up with KK Sport Key from Novi Sad where he played from 2003 to 2007 when he goes to Partizan. In 2010 he goes to Crvena zvezda where he stayed one season.

For the 2011–12 season he signed with KK Smederevo where he had great season and was named the MVP of the Basketball League of Serbia.

In March 2012 he signed with BKK Radnički for Serbian Super League but played only nine games and then left the team. Following season he started with Târgu Mureş, but left them in December 2012.

In October 2013, he signed with Vršac. He left them after only two games and signed with Feni Industries. In February 2014, he returned to Serbia and signed with his former team Smederevo.

In September 2014, he signed with the Hungarian club Naturtex SZTE-Szedeák for the 2014–15 season.

On October 1, 2015, he signed with the Greek club PAOK. However he left PAOK later that month after appearing in two league games and three Eurocup games. On December 2, 2015, he signed with Romanian club Dinamo București for the rest of the 2015–16 Liga Națională season.

On November 16, 2017, he signed with Borac Čačak for the rest of the 2017–18 season. On August 18, 2018, he signed with Club Melilla Baloncesto of the LEB Oro.

In the 2021–22 season, he played for Kouchin Amol of the Iranian Basketball Super League.

In July 2022, Balaban joined the Rwandan team APR of the Rwanda Basketball League.

References

External links
 Darko Balaban at aba-liga.com
 Darko Balaban at eurobasket.com
 Darko Balaban at euroleague.net
 Darko Balaban at fiba.com

1989 births
Living people
ABA League players
BC Balkan Botevgrad players
Basketball League of Serbia players
Centers (basketball)
Club Africain basketball players
Competitors at the 2013 Mediterranean Games
KK Borac Čačak players
KK Partizan players
KK Crvena zvezda players
KK Smederevo players
KK Vršac players
Mediterranean Games medalists in basketball
Mediterranean Games silver medalists for Serbia
Melilla Baloncesto players
P.A.O.K. BC players
BKK Radnički players
Serbian expatriate basketball people in Bulgaria
Serbian expatriate basketball people in Greece
Serbian expatriate basketball people in Hungary
Serbian expatriate basketball people in North Macedonia
Serbian expatriate basketball people in Romania
Serbian expatriate basketball people in Spain
Serbian expatriate basketball people in Tunisia
Serbian men's basketball players
Basketball players from Novi Sad
SZTE-Szedeák players
Universiade bronze medalists for Serbia
Universiade medalists in basketball
Medalists at the 2013 Summer Universiade
APR B.C. players